Farm Loop is a census-designated place (CDP) in Matanuska-Susitna Borough, Alaska, United States. It is part of the Anchorage, Alaska Metropolitan Statistical Area. At the 2020 census the population was 2,747, up from 1,028 in 2010.

Geography
Farm Loop is located at  (61.628426, -149.145602).

Demographics

Farm Loop first appeared on the 2000 U.S. Census as a census-designated place (CDP).

As of the census of 2000, there were 1,067 people, 334 households, and 268 families residing in the CDP. There were 350 housing units at an average density of 39.6/sq mi (15.3/km2). The racial makeup of the CDP was 93.0% White, 0.3% Black or African American, 3.4% Native American, 0.3% Asian, 0.1% Pacific Islander, 0.2% from other races, and 2.8% from two or more races.  2.4% of the population were Hispanic or Latino of any race.

There were 334 households, out of which 47.0% had children under the age of 18 living with them, 67.1% were married couples living together, 8.4% had a female householder with no husband present, and 19.5% were non-families. 14.1% of all households were made up of individuals, and 2.7% had someone living alone who was 65 years of age or older.  The average household size was 3.19 and the average family size was 3.55.

In the CDP, the population was spread out, with 36.2% under the age of 18, 6.6% from 18 to 24, 27.9% from 25 to 44, 24.4% from 45 to 64, and 5.0% who were 65 years of age or older.  The median age was 34 years. For every 100 females, there were 104.4 males.  For every 100 females age 18 and over, there were 95.1 males.

The median income for a household in the CDP was $55,234, and the median income for a family was $56,953. Males had a median income of $44,417 versus $31,705 for females. The per capita income for the CDP was $20,880.  About 6.1% of families and 7.2% of the population were below the poverty line, including 6.6% of those under age 18 and none of those age 65 or over.

References

Census-designated places in Matanuska-Susitna Borough, Alaska
Census-designated places in Alaska
Anchorage metropolitan area